Strange is a six-part American comic book limited series published by Marvel Comics under their Marvel Knights imprint. 
Written by J. Michael Straczynski and Samm Barnes, with artwork by Brandon Peterson, Strange is a re-imagining of Doctor Strange's origin.

Synopsis

While in Tibet, a medical student named Stephen Strange meets a sickly, apparently mute young man named Wong. He later meets an old man while going to a monastery called "the Garden of Fountains", who asks him why he wants to become a doctor. Later, he hears the young man named Wong start talking after Stephen gives him a watch, hoping he will return later in life. Three years later, at his graduation party, one of Stephen's college professors who believes he would be more than a "medical profession's version of a pimp" is killed in an automobile incident. Three years after that, Stephen is working in plastic surgery in New York but is injured in a skiing accident.

Stephen loses the full ability to use his hands after the accident and starts looking for a surgeon who can fix his hands, but finds no one who can help. 
Strange meets a member of doctors without borders who he had worked with in Tibet, who explains that Wong is now a specialist "healer" in alternative medicine. Strange returns to Tibet to discover that the village he had volunteered in had been destroyed and Wong had left. While in Tibet, Strange meets a man who knew Wong and receives Wongs address in New York. Strange returns to New York to meet with Wong.

References

External links
Comics Book DB Page
Worlds of JMS page

Marvel Comics limited series